Thamnosma is a genus of flowering plants in the rue family, Rutaceae. Plants in this genus are sometimes known by the common name desertrue.

Selected species
 Thamnosma africana — Sandboegoe
 Thamnosma montana Torr. & Frém. — Turpentinebroom, Mohave desert rue
 Thamnosma socotrana Balf.f.
 Thamnosma somalensis Thulin
 Thamnosma texana (Gray) Torr. — Texas desert rue

References

External links

 
Rutaceae genera
Taxonomy articles created by Polbot